Jessica Morris (born in Jacksonville, Florida ) is an American actress.

Career
After several small film and television roles, Morris was cast as the dysfunctional Jennifer Rappaport on the ABC soap opera, One Life to Live, a role she portrayed from 2001 to 2005 and in a dream sequence on October 1, 2008.

In 2008 Morris appeared in the comedy Role Models as "Linda the Teacher". She was in the cast of the 2010 fantasy film Fading of the Cries. In 2014 Morris played the lead role in the horror film Haunting of the Innocent.

In 2014, Morris played Diane Hamilton in the soap opera web series Beacon Hill.

Filmography

Film

Television

References

External links

Living people
Actresses from Jacksonville, Florida
Robert E. Lee High School (Jacksonville) alumni
American film actresses
American television actresses
American soap opera actresses
21st-century American women
Year of birth missing (living people)